Federalna.ba is a popular web portal in Bosnia and Herzegovina. It was founded in October 2011 as a new web portal for Federalna Televizija and Federalni Radio.

The owner of Federalna.ba is RTVFBiH, a Bosnian entity level public service broadcaster.

See also 
 Media in Sarajevo
 Media of Bosnia and Herzegovina

Notes

External links 
 www.federalna.ba
 RTVFBiH website
 Federalna.ba on Facebook.

Web portals
Mass media in Bosnia and Herzegovina
2011 establishments in Bosnia and Herzegovina
Radio-Television of the Federation of Bosnia and Herzegovina